Dale Philip is a Scottish former poker player. He has won several online poker tournaments in his peak career.

Early life 
Philip was born on 17 January 1995, in Edinburgh, Scotland (Great Britain).

Career 
Phillip used to work an IT/software job until he had become successful enough at poker which he had quit in 2010. After leaving Edinburgh, Scotland for a short time to travel for poker tournaments, he chose being a poker player as a full time profession.

He was later removed from Team PokerStars Online on 17 June 2014, allegedly due to his behavior at an event in Marbella, Spain.

As of now, Philip is a YouTube travel vlogger and has visited more than 50 countries.

Philip in June, 2020 posted a TikTok video of bargaining for a street snack in Jaipur, Rajasthan (India) which created a debate online.

In January 2021 Philip was booked in Kerala, India by Munnar District Forest Officer (DFO) for entering the Munnar forest without permission.

Philip went to Clifton Beach, Karachi (Pakistan) in May 2022 where he was allegedly ‘cheated’ by horsemen there, about which he later posted a video on social media with the title “avoid this horse ride scam”. In response to this, Karachi Police arrested the horseman within hours.

References

External links 

People from Edinburgh
1995 births
Living people
Scottish YouTubers
YouTube travel vloggers
Scottish poker players